Mogalakwena Local Municipality is located in the Waterberg District Municipality of Limpopo province, South Africa. The seat of Mogalakwena Local Municipality is Mokopane.

Main places
The 2001 census divided the municipality into the following main places:

Politics 
The municipal council consists of sixty-four members elected by mixed-member proportional representation. Thirty-two councillors are elected by first-past-the-post voting in thirty-two wards, while the remaining thirty-two are chosen from party lists so that the total number of party representatives is proportional to the number of votes received. In the election of 3 August 2016 the African National Congress (ANC) won a majority of forty-one seats on the council.
The following table shows the results of the election.

See also 
Mogalakwena River

References

External links 
 Official homepage
Mogalakwena (LIM 367) Proposed Ward
MDB Proposal for Mogalakwena Local Municipality

Local municipalities of the Waterberg District Municipality